The Commons is an Australian streaming television drama series from Stan about climate change and biotechnology set in the future. The eight part, character-driven thriller looks at ethical boundaries and the place of humanity in saving the planet.

Premise 
Eadie, a radical and gifted neuropsychologist, is desperate for a child. In that quest, she faces intellectual property theft, disaster capitalism and eugenics.

Cast
 Joanne Froggatt
David Lyons
Ryan Corr
Rupert Penry-Jones
 Damon Herriman
 John Waters
 Fayssal Bazzi
 Simone McAullay
 Andrea Demetriades
 Felix Williamson
 Inez Currò
 Dominic Ona-Ariki
 Zara Michales
 Sara West
 Anthony Brandon Wong as Harlow 
 Carma Sharon
 Finn Curran

Episodes

Production
The Commons was written by Shelley Birse with Matt Ford, Michael Miller and Matt Cameron. It is produced by Diane Haddon for Playmaker in association with Sony Pictures Television. Jeffrey Walker is the director with Rowan Woods and Jen Leacey.

The series aired on Sundance Now in the United States in 2020.

References

External links
 
 

2019 Australian television series debuts
Dystopian television series
English-language television shows
Television shows set in Sydney
Television series by Playmaker Media
Stan (service) original programming